The television series McLeod's Daughters had many different songs for their closing credits which were written by Posie Graeme-Evans and Chris Harriot and performed by singer Rebecca Lavelle.

Production
In 2008, Graeme-Evans tells of the songwriting process for the soundtracks.For me, writing the songs for McLeod's has become an emotional journey into the heart of the series and the characters we've all come to love so much. I'd always thought Chris Harriott and I could use songs as a way to get under the skin of Claire, Tess, Meg, Jodi, Becky, Nick and Alex; almost like tools within an episode, the songs would give voice to what the characters were feeling but could not say. But as Chris and I have developed the songs, they've become much more to me than that: they've become a way of exploring how we all feel, the things we'd all like to say.The music was performed primarily by Rebecca Lavelle. A few songs were performed by other artists including Abi Tucker and Doris Youanne. Three CDs, called McLeod's Daughters: Songs from the Series, were released in 2002, 2004, and 2008:

List

References

External links
 McLeod's Daughters Official Website

McLeod's Daughters